Diplacodes bipunctata is a species of dragonfly in the family Libellulidae,
known as the wandering percher or red percher dragonfly.

Description
Diplacodes bipunctata is a small to medium-sized dragonfly with a wingspan of about 55 millimeters. The wings are colorless except for a yellowish spot at the base of the hindwing. The male has a bright orange or red abdomen with dark markings along the dorsal line and sides, and the female is yellowish with similar markings. There are two dark spots at the side of the synthorax, one of which is the metastigma.

Range
In Australia it is found throughout the continent except in Tasmania. It is found near a wide variety of freshwater pools, streams and swamps.

Biology
This species is an early colonizer of appropriate habitat types in freshwater and brackish waters.

Gallery

References

Libellulidae
Odonata of New Zealand
Odonata of Oceania
Odonata of Australia
Insects of Indonesia
Taxa named by Friedrich Moritz Brauer
Insects described in 1865